Yŏhaejin station is a railway station in greater Tanch'ŏn city, South Hamgyŏng province, North Korea. Located on the P'yŏngra Line of the Korean State Railway, it is also the starting point of the Kŭmgol Line. The station was opened in 1924.

References

Railway stations in North Korea
1924 establishments in Korea
Railway stations opened in 1924